Roblin is an unincorporated urban community in the Municipality of Roblin, Manitoba, Canada.

Prior to 1 January 2015, Roblin was designated as a town. In 2010, the Town of Roblin and the former Rural Municipalities of Hillsburg and Shell River had a total population of 3,284.

About 40% of the population is involved in agriculture and other resource-based industries. Services, tourism and the processing of wood and agricultural products largely contribute to the local economy.

History 

During the 1880s, the first group of Europeans to settle in Roblin were mainly Cattle ranchers and grain farmers In 1903, many Eastern European farming families also settled in Roblin with the arrival of the railway. The village was originally named Goose Lake but was renamed Roblin in 1904 after the Premier of Manitoba, Rodmond Palen Roblin. Also in 1904, the post office was established as Goose Lake and was located on 8-26-28W. The first postmaster was W. Atkey and the first mayor was Irwin L. Mitchell (1882-1956) who served from 1914 to 1917. In addition, Roblin also served as the location for the former Saint Vladimir's College. Later, on 1 May 1912, the village was incorporated and became a town on May 1, 1962. Roblin celebrated its 100th anniversary in July 2013. The current mayor of the municipality of Roblin is Robert Misko.

Krosney Lake (east of East Goose Lake) is a commemorative lake officially named by the Geographical Names Board of Canada in memory of Private Darren Michael Krosney (July 4, 1965, Winnipeg, Manitoba – August 21, 1983).

Demographics 

Recreation 
Roblin is located on Goose Lake and Krosney Lake, and is within a short drive to Lake of the Prairies. The community is located between Duck Mountain Provincial Park and Riding Mountain National Park. Moreover, Roblin has a 9-hole golf course, outdoor swimming pool, ice arena, curling rink and movie theater.

Transportation 
Roblin is 90 km west of Dauphin via PTH 5, about a 45-minute drive east from Yorkton on PTH 5, and is accessible by the Roblin railway station, which is served by Via Rail.

References 

Geographical Names Board of Canada, 2011-07-08

External links 

 Roblin, "Jewel of the Parkland", official site

Unincorporated communities in Parkland Region, Manitoba
Unincorporated urban communities in Manitoba
Former towns in Manitoba
Populated places disestablished in 2015
2015 disestablishments in Manitoba